2005 Dubai Tennis Championships. Mahesh Bhupathi and Fabrice Santoro were the defending champions.  Bhupathi partnered with Todd Woodbridge, losing in the semifinals.  Santoro partnered with Jonas Björkman, finishing runner-up.

Martin Damm and Radek Štěpánek won in the final 6–2, 6–4, against Jonas Björkman and Fabrice Santoro.

Seeds

Draw

Draw

External links
Draw

2005 Dubai Tennis Championships
2005 ATP Tour